Blvk Phil Collins (stylized as BLVKPHILCOLLINS) is an EP by American hip hop recording artist OG Maco. It was released September 20, 2016, by OGG.

Track listing

Notes
"Move" is a cover of DJ Snake's original song "Talk" featuring George Maple.

References 

2016 EPs
All articles with unsourced statements
OG Maco albums
Quality Control Music albums